Herbert Carey Tregurtha 'Bert' Sutton (15 April 1901 – 17 August 1981) was an Australian rules footballer who played with South Melbourne and Hawthorn in the Victorian Football League (VFL) during the 1920s.

Early life
The son of Thomas Henry Baldock Sutton (1865–1934) and Alice Melita Sutton, nee Tregurtha (1869–1950), Herbert Carey Tregurtha Sutton was born at Williamstown on 15 April 1901.

Football
Sutton, who came to South Melbourne from Williamstown, was used mostly as a flanker.

He left South Melbourne in 1924 to captain-coach St Patrick's in the Ovens & Murray Football League to the premiership.

In 1925 he moved on to captain-coach North Launceston for a season and also steered them to a premiership.

After another stint at South Melbourne, Sutton crossed to Hawthorn in 1928 as captain-coach but the club failed to win a game all year and he was not retained for the 1929 season.

Sutton was later an umpire in the Victorian Junior Football League.

War service
Sutton served in the Volunteer Defence Corps during World War II.

Later life
Sutton married Mary Christina Evans (1900–1979) on 29 June 1929 at Wesley Church in Melbourne. They subsequently moved to Adelaide where they had a son and then to Sydney where they settled in the suburb of Concord.

Bert Sutton died in Sydney on 17 August 1981 and was cremated at Rookwood Cemetery.

Notes

References
Holmesby, Russell and Main, Jim (2007). The Encyclopedia of AFL Footballers. 7th ed. Melbourne: Bas Publishing.

External links

Bert Sutton's playing statistics from The VFA Project

1901 births
1981 deaths
Australian rules footballers from Melbourne
Australian Rules footballers: place kick exponents
Sydney Swans players
Hawthorn Football Club players
Hawthorn Football Club coaches
Williamstown Football Club players
North Launceston Football Club players
North Launceston Football Club coaches
People from Williamstown, Victoria